Kapalkundala is a 1981 Bengali drama film directed and produced by Pinaki Bhushan Mukherji. It starred Ranjit Mallick, Bhanu Bannerjee and Mahua Roy Chowdhury in lead roles. This was the fourth remake of Kapalakundala based on 1866 same name novel of Bankimchandra Chattopadhyay.

Plot
Nabakumar, a youngman loses his way in the forest while returning from Gangasagar. A Tantric trapps him to sacrifice him before the goddess Kali. A lady Kapalkundala rescues Nabakumar. He marriede Kapalkundala and returned his village Saptagram. The Tantric plans to take revenge against both of them.

Cast
 Ranjit Mallick as Nabakumar
 Mahua Roychoudhury as Kapalkundala
 Bhanu Bannerjee
 Ajitesh Bandopadhyay
 Sumitra Mukherjee
 Samita Biswas
 Ardhendu Mukherjee

References

External links
 

1981 films
1981 drama films
Bengali-language Indian films
Indian historical drama films
1980s historical drama films
1980s Bengali-language films
Films based on Indian novels